Amphilestidae is a family of Mesozoic mammals, generally regarded as eutriconodonts. They may form a paraphyletic or polyphyletic assemblage, though they share with gobiconodontids their similar tooth occlusion patterns and may be especially closely related to them. They occur from the Middle Jurassic to Cenomanian, and have a distribution across Laurasia.

The putative amphilestid Tendagurodon is considered a non-amphilestid member of Amphilestheria along with the newly described Condorodon by Gaetano and Rougier (2012).

References

Eutriconodonts
Jurassic mammals
Bathonian first appearances
Cenomanian extinctions
Taxa named by Henry Fairfield Osborn
Prehistoric mammal families
Fossil taxa described in 1888